The 2020 North Alabama Lions football team represented the University of North Alabama during the 2020–21 NCAA Division I FCS football season. They were led by fourth-year head coach Chris Willis. The Lions played their home games at Braly Municipal Stadium as second-year members of the Big South Conference.

Previous season

The Lions finished the 2019 season with a record of 4–7, 3–4 in Big South play, however due to their transition to NCAA Division I, their official conference record was 0–0.

Schedule
North Alabama originally had games scheduled against Monmouth, Hampton and Virginia Tech, but they were canceled due to each school's decision to cancel fall sports due to the COVID-19 pandemic.

Schedule Source:

Game summaries

at Liberty

Jacksonville State

at Southern Miss

at BYU
Sources:

References

North Alabama
North Alabama Lions football seasons
North Alabama Lions football
College football winless seasons